New Market is a census-designated place located in Fairview Township, York County in the state of Pennsylvania.  The community is located near the Susquehanna River in far northern York County, near the borough of New Cumberland which is located in Cumberland County.  As of the 2010 census the population was 816 residents.

Demographics

References

Census-designated places in York County, Pennsylvania
Census-designated places in Pennsylvania